Acanthostracion is a genus of boxfishes native to the Atlantic Ocean.

Species
There are currently 4 recognized species in this genus:
Acanthostracion guineensis (Bleeker, 1865)
Acanthostracion notacanthus (Bleeker, 1863) (Island cowfish)
Acanthostracion polygonius Poey, 1876 (Honeycomb cowfish)
Acanthostracion quadricornis (Linnaeus, 1758) (Scrawled cowfish)

References

 
Ray-finned fish genera
Taxa named by Pieter Bleeker